Robert Kennedy Remembered is a 1968 American short documentary film produced and directed by Charles Guggenheim. In 1969, it won an Oscar for Best Short Subject at the 41st Academy Awards.

Cast
 Robert F. Kennedy as himself (archive footage)

References

External links

Robert Kennedy Remembered at the John F. Kennedy Presidential Library & Museum

1968 films
1968 short films
1968 documentary films
1968 independent films
1960s short documentary films
American short documentary films
Documentary films about Robert F. Kennedy
Live Action Short Film Academy Award winners
American independent films
Films directed by Charles Guggenheim
1960s English-language films
1960s American films